The Sacred Heart Pioneers women's basketball team represents Sacred Heart University in Fairfield, Connecticut, United States. The school's team currently competes in the Northeast Conference. They play their home games at the William H. Pitt Center.

History
In each of their three NCAA Division I Tournament appearances, they have lost each time in the First Round, losing 95–54 to Maryland 77–63 to Ohio State, and 76–50 to Georgia Tech, respectively. They appeared in the WBI in 2011 and the WNIT in 2013 and 2016. As of the end of the 2015–16 season, the Pioneers have an all-time record of 559–552.

Season-by-season results
{| class="wikitable"

|- align="center"

Postseason

NCAA Division I tournament results
The Pioneers have appeared in the NCAA Division I Tournament three times. Their record is 0–3

WNIT results

References

External links